Aleksei Andreyevich Miranchuk (born 17 October 1995) is a Russian professional footballer who plays as an attacking midfielder or striker for  club Torino, on loan from Atalanta, and the Russian national team.

Early years
Born in Slavyansk-na-Kubani to Andrey and Elena Miranchuk, Aleksey and his twin Anton started playing football in his hometown football school Olymp. Then, he and Anton arrived in Moscow, joining the youth ranks of Spartak Moscow. However, they did not last long in this club, being expelled because of their insufficient physical abilities.

Then, the twin brothers were spotted by the managers of Lokomotiv Moscow, who invited them to join the club. Aleksei won three Russian League titles in his age category and scored a goal in the final twice. In October 2012, he was named MVP of the Russian Football Union cup.

Club career

Lokomotiv Moscow
At the age of 17, Miranchuk made his debut in the Russian Premier League for Lokomotiv Moscow on 20 April 2013 as a starter in away game versus Kuban (0–0). On 5 May 2013, Miranchuk scored his first senior goal and made first assist in away game against Amkar which Lokomotiv won 4–2. He scored a header from Maicon pass in the first half and provided an assist for Renat Yanbayev in the second half.

He made his debut in UEFA Europa League on 28 August 2014, coming on as a second-half substitution for Manuel Fernandes in a 1–4 defeat to Cypriot side Apollon Limassol.

His performances got him the title of the best Lokomotiv player of the month by fans' poll on social networks in April 2015 and May 2015.

On 21 May 2015, Miranchuk scored a solo goal against Kuban Krasnodar in extra time of the Russian Cup final, helping Lokomotiv win the sixth Russian Cup title in history.

Later on, he won the 2017–18 Russian Premier League with Lokomotiv, scoring seven goals in that season. On 6 July 2019, he scored two goals in a 3–2 win over Zenit Saint Petersburg in the 2019 Russian Super Cup.

Atalanta
In August 2020, Miranchuk joined Italian club Atalanta for about €15m. On 30 August 2020, Lokomotiv confirmed that the transfer has been agreed and would be completed following the medical exam. On 21 October 2020, Miranchuk made his debut for Atalanta as a substitute against Midtjylland in the Champions League and scored his first goal for the club. He made his Serie A debut for the club on 8 November and scored his side's goal in a 1–1 draw with Inter Milan. He also scored in his Coppa Italia debut on 14 January 2021, in a 3–1 victory over Cagliari in the round of 16. In two seasons with Atalanta, Miranchuk appeared in 56 matches across all competitions and scored nine goals.

Loan to Torino
On 11 August 2022, Miranchuk joined Torino on a season-long loan with option to buy.

International career
Miranchuk made his debut for the Russia national football team on 7 June 2015 in a friendly against Belarus at the Arena Khimki, replacing Yuri Zhirkov in the 71st minute and scoring Russia's third of a 4–2 victory twelve minutes later.

On 11 May 2018, he was included in Russia's extended 2018 FIFA World Cup squad. On 3 June 2018, he was included in the finalized World Cup squad. His only World Cup appearance came as a starter in the last group-stage game against Uruguay which Russia lost 0–3 and Miranchuk was substituted by Fyodor Smolov after an hour of play.

On 11 May 2021, he was included in the preliminary extended 30-man squad for UEFA Euro 2020. On 2 June 2021, he was included in the final squad. In Russia's opening game against Belgium on 12 June, he appeared as a second-half substitute as Russia lost 0–3. He started in the match against Finland on 16 June, and scored Russia's lone goal in a 1–0 victory over Finland. He started again on 21 June in the last group game against Denmark as Russia lost 1–4 and was eliminated, and Miranchuk was substituted after an hour of play.

Career statistics

Club

International

Scores and results list Russia's goal tally first, score column indicates score after each Miranchuk goal.

Honours
Lokomotiv Moscow
Russian Premier League: 2017–18
Russian Cup: 2014–15, 2016–17, 2018–19
Russian Super Cup: 2019

Individual
Best under-21 player of the Russian Football Premier League: 2013–14

References

External links
Profile at Russian Football Premier League site 
Profile at FC Lokomotiv Moscow site 

Living people
1995 births
People from Slavyansk-na-Kubani
Russian twins
Twin sportspeople
Russian footballers
Association football midfielders
Russia youth international footballers
Russia under-21 international footballers
Russia international footballers
FC Lokomotiv Moscow players
Atalanta B.C. players
Torino F.C. players
Russian Premier League players
Serie A players
2017 FIFA Confederations Cup players
2018 FIFA World Cup players
UEFA Euro 2020 players
Russian expatriate footballers
Russian expatriate sportspeople in Italy
Expatriate footballers in Italy
Sportspeople from Krasnodar Krai
Russian people of Ukrainian descent